Sörenstam is a Swedish surname. Notable people with the surname include:

Annika Sörenstam (born 1970), Swedish professional golfer
Charlotta Sörenstam (born 1973), Swedish professional golfer, sister of Annika

Swedish-language surnames